Lalita  is a 1984 Indian Bengali film directed by Tapan Chowdhury.

Plot
Lalita is the story of a bright young Lalita who is raped by her university friend Saibal.

Cast
 Dipankar Dey
 Santosh Dutta
 Santu Mukhopadhyay
 Tarun Kumar
 Subrata Chattopadhyay
 Padma Devi
 Sumitra Mukherjee
 Pradip Mukhopadhyay
 Satya Bandyopadhyay 
 Sibani Bose

References

1984 films
Bengali-language Indian films
1980s Bengali-language films